The Detroit Dark Angels were a women's semi-professional American football team founded in 2010 by Chuck Lauber and Aaron Brothers. In 2014, the team was purchased and reorganized as a 501(c)3 corporation DDA Football Inc., by a group that included former Detroit Demolition players Alecia Sweeney and Yarlen Henry along with Coach Keith Thomas.

Based in the Detroit, Michigan area, the Dark Angels played their home games at Southfield HS and The Hawk Community Center Farmington Hills, Michigan. The Dark Angels were members of the Women's Football Alliance (WFA) and competed in Division 2 of the WFA's three-tier structure.

History
The Detroit Dark Angels were founded in 2010 by Chuck Lauber and Aaron Brothers following the discontinuation of the Detroit Demolition. Players from the Demolition formed the core of the new team. Former Demolition players included linebackers Kim Walters and Misty Findley, tackles Lisa Miles and Mindy Corby, running back Aisha Moore, center Alecia Sweeney, wide receiver Kristine Vidojevski and lineman Catherine Moss. The team was led by Head Coach Tony Gaisser (3-5) in their first season.

In 2011, Darrin Wubbenhorst (22-20) was named Head Coach, a position he held through 2015.

In 2016, the team was purchased and reorganized as a 501(c)3 corporation DDA Football Inc., by a group that included former Detroit Demolition player Alecia Sweeney. Keith Thomas (25-19), a long-time member of the coaching staff, was named Head Coach.

Westland John Glenn High School was established as the Dark Angels's home venue in its inaugural season, until 2016. The team then changed home stadiums several times, moving to Wayne Memorial High School in 2017, Southfield Lathrup High School in 2018, and the HAWK Community Center in Farmington Hills in 2021.

Highlights

Highlights for the team include the 2012 season when they went undefeated 8–0 in the regular season. They were eliminated in the playoffs by the Pittsburgh Passion.

The Dark Angels got revenge on Pittsburgh when they eliminated the Passion in the 2019 WFA Division 2 National Conference Championship Game. The victory propelled the team to their first national championship game, but they fell to the St. Louis Slam.

In 2021, the team's final season, the Dark Angels again reached the WFA Division 2 National Championship Game but lost to the Nevada Storm.

Season-By-Season

|-
|2010 || 3 || 5 || 0 || 3rd National North Central || --
|-
|2011 || 6 || 2 || 0 || 2nd National North Central || --
|-
|2012 || 8 || 1 || 0 || 1st National Mideast || Lost National Conference Wild Card (Pittsburgh)
|-
|2013 || 2 || 6 || 0 || 3rd National Great Lakes || --
|-
|2014 || 4 || 4 || 0 || 3rd National Great Lakes || --
|-
|2015 || 2 || 6 || 0 || 4th National Great Lakes || --
|-
|2016 || 3 || 5 || 0 || 4th National Great Lakes || --
|-
|2017 || 4 || 4 || 0 || 8th National Conference (Tier 2) || --
|-
|2018 || 5 || 3 || 0 || 5th National Conference (Tier 2) || --
|-
|2019 || 6 || 2 || 0 || 3rd National Conference (Tier 2) || Won Regional Final (Columbus Comets)Won National Conference Final (Pittsburgh)Lost WFA Division 2 Championship (St. Louis)
|-
|2021 || 3 || 3 || 0 || 1st National Conference (Tier 2) || Won Regional Final (Baltimore)Won National Conference Final (Jacksonville)Lost WFA Division 2 Championship (Nevada Storm)
|-
!Totals || 50 || 44 || 0
|colspan=2|

2010

Season Schedules

2011

Standings

Season Schedules

2012

Standings

Season schedule

2013

Season Schedules

Roster

References

Detroit Dark Angels website
Women's Football Alliance website

Women's Football Alliance teams
American football teams in Detroit
American football teams established in 2010
2010 establishments in Michigan